In applied mathematics, the numerical sign problem is the problem of numerically evaluating the integral of a highly oscillatory function of a large number of variables. Numerical methods fail because of the near-cancellation of the positive and negative contributions to the integral. Each has to be integrated to very high precision in order for their difference to be obtained with useful accuracy.

The sign problem is one of the major unsolved problems in the physics of many-particle systems. It often arises in calculations of the properties of a quantum mechanical system with large number of strongly interacting fermions, or in field theories involving a non-zero density of strongly interacting fermions.

Overview

In physics the sign problem is typically (but not exclusively) encountered in calculations of the properties of a quantum mechanical system with large number of strongly interacting fermions, or in field theories involving a non-zero density of strongly interacting fermions. Because the particles are strongly interacting, perturbation theory is inapplicable, and one is forced to use brute-force numerical methods. Because the particles are fermions, their wavefunction changes sign when any two fermions are interchanged (due to the anti-symmetry of the wave function, see Pauli principle). So unless there are cancellations arising from some symmetry of the system, the quantum-mechanical sum over all multi-particle states involves an integral over a function that is highly oscillatory, hence hard to evaluate numerically, particularly in high dimension. Since the dimension of the integral is given by the number of particles, the sign problem becomes severe in the thermodynamic limit. The field-theoretic manifestation of the sign problem is discussed below.

The sign problem is one of the major unsolved problems in the physics of many-particle systems, impeding progress in many areas:
 Condensed matter physics — It prevents the numerical solution of systems with a high density of strongly correlated electrons, such as the Hubbard model.
 Nuclear physics — It prevents the ab initio calculation of properties of nuclear matter and hence limits our understanding of nuclei and neutron stars.
 Quantum field theory — It prevents the use of lattice QCD to predict the phases and properties of quark matter. (In lattice field theory, the problem is also known as the complex action problem.)

The sign problem in field theory

In a field-theory approach to multi-particle systems, the fermion density is controlled by the value of the fermion chemical potential . The sum over fermion fields can be performed analytically, and one is left with a sum over the bosonic fields  (which may have been originally part of the theory, or have been produced by a Hubbard–Stratonovich transformation to make the fermion action quadratic)

where  represents the measure for the sum over all configurations  of the bosonic fields, weighted by

The expectation value of an observable  is therefore an average over all configurations weighted by :

If  is positive, then it can be interpreted as a probability measure, and  can be calculated by performing the sum over field configurations numerically, using standard techniques such as Monte Carlo importance sampling.

The sign problem arises when  is non-positive. This typically occurs in theories of fermions when the fermion chemical potential  is nonzero, i.e. when there is a nonzero background density of fermions.

Reweighting procedure 

A field theory with a non-positive weight can be transformed to one with a positive weight by incorporating the non-positive part (sign or complex phase) of the weight into the observable. For example, one could decompose the weighting function into its modulus and phase:

where  is real and positive, so

Note that the desired expectation value is now a ratio where the numerator and denominator are expectation values that both use a positive weighting function . However, the phase  is a highly oscillatory function in the configuration space, so if one uses Monte Carlo methods to evaluate the numerator and denominator, each of them will evaluate to a very small number, whose exact value is swamped by the noise inherent in the Monte Carlo sampling process. The "badness" of the sign problem is measured by the smallness of the denominator : if it is much less than 1, then the sign problem is severe.
It can be shown that

The number of Monte Carlo sampling points needed to obtain an accurate result therefore rises exponentially as the volume of the system becomes large, and as the temperature goes to zero.

The decomposition of the weighting function into modulus and phase is just one example (although it has been advocated as the optimal choice since it minimizes the variance of the denominator). In general one could write

where  can be any positive weighting function (for example, the weighting function of the  theory). The badness of the sign problem is then measured by

which again goes to zero exponentially in the large-volume limit.

Methods for reducing the sign problem

The sign problem is NP-hard, implying that a full and generic solution of the sign problem would also solve all problems in the complexity class NP in polynomial time. If (as is generally suspected) there are no polynomial-time solutions to NP problems (see P versus NP problem), then there is no generic solution to the sign problem. This leaves open the possibility that there may be solutions that work in specific cases, where the oscillations of the integrand have a structure that can be exploited to reduce the numerical errors.

There are various proposals for solving systems with a severe sign problem:

 Meron-cluster algorithms. These achieve an exponential speed-up by decomposing the fermion world lines into clusters that contribute independently. Cluster algorithms have been developed for certain theories, but not for the Hubbard model of electrons, nor for QCD, the theory of quarks.
 Stochastic quantization. The sum over configurations is obtained as the equilibrium distribution of states explored by a complex Langevin equation. So far, the algorithm has been found to evade the sign problem in test models that have a sign problem but do not involve fermions.
 Fixed-node method. One fixes the location of nodes (zeros) of the multiparticle wavefunction, and uses Monte Carlo methods to obtain an estimate of the energy of the ground state, subject to that constraint.
 Majorana algorithms. Using Majorana fermion representation to perform Hubbard-Stratonovich transformations can help to solve the fermion sign problem of a class of fermionic many-body models.
Diagrammatic Monte Carlo - based on stochastically and strategically sampling Feynman diagrams

See also
 Method of stationary phase
 Oscillatory integral

Footnotes

References

Statistical mechanics
Numerical artefacts
Unsolved problems in physics